Streetbeefs (or StreetBeefs or Street Beefs) is an American backyard fighting club and YouTube channel founded by Virginia resident Christopher "Scarface" Wilmore in 2008 that hosts fighting events with combat sports mediums such as boxing, kickboxing, jiujitsu, and mixed martial arts. Wilmore hosts the events at various locations on the East Coast, with their primary base of operations being located in Harrisonburg, Virginia. They have fighters of varied skill levels, but they are notable for providing an avenue for inexperienced fighters outside of more formal amateur competitions. Since there is no admission fee, and no payment, it is not regulated by the state athletic commission. 

Wilmore originally founded the organization to help settle disputes and provide an alternative to more dangerous forms of street violence. During the early days of its inception, they had no medical professionals present, but now they have a registered nurse. Streetbeefs now has various "branches" located across the United States. Streetbeefs West Coast operates out of Las Vegas, Nevada, and Arizona. Streetbeefs Scrapyard operates out of Gig Harbor, Washington, and Streetbeefs Dirty South operates out of Texas. The 2016 documentary "Guns to Gloves" features Wilmore telling his story.

Weight classes are enforced, and fighters are asked to provide ID to confirm that they are over the age of 18.

In "beef matches", there are no weight classes, and no winner is declared and both participants are encouraged to shake hands and end their dispute.

12 ounce boxing gloves are utilized for boxing and kickboxing, and 4-ounce MMA gloves are used for MMA.

As of February 2023, the Streetbeefs YouTube channel currently has nearly 700 million views and almost 3 million subscribers. Streetbeefs has also received nationwide coverage by many major publications, including The New York Times, The Washington Post, ESPN, and The New Yorker among various others.

Streetbeefs also has a surprisingly large following in Germany, recently appearing in major German newspaper Die Zeit, and has appeared in two separate German television programs, including a television program in Austria.

Notes

References

External links
 

Mixed martial arts